Wiqruqucha (Quechua wiqru twisted, bent qucha lake, "bent lake", hispanicized spelling Huecrococha) is a lake in Peru located in the Ancash Region, Huaylas Province, Yuracmarca District. It is situated in the Cordillera Blanca, northeast of Millwaqucha and Pilanku, and north of Pukahirka and a lake named Shuytuqucha.

References 

Lakes of Peru
Lakes of Ancash Region